Kaseliyan Rural District is a rural district (dehestan) in the Central District of Savadkuh County, Mazandaran Province, Iran. At the 2006 census, its population was 3,872, in 927 families. The rural district has 15 villages.

Lesser populated places (current and former) 
See the navigation box at the bottom for notable populated places.
Zazul (also Romanized as Zazūl or Zazoul), an abadi.( ) At the 2006 census, its existence was noted, but its population was not reported.

References 

Rural Districts of Mazandaran Province
Savadkuh County